Lissanthe strigosa, sometimes referred as the peach heath, is a common shrub from the heath family, found in eastern and southern Australia.

This plant first appeared in the scientific literature in A Specimen of the Botany of New Holland by James Edward Smith in 1793. Then in 1810, in the Prodromus Florae Novae Hollandiae, authored by the Scottish botanist, Robert Brown.

References

Epacridoideae
Ericales of Australia
Flora of New South Wales
Flora of Queensland
Flora of Tasmania
Flora of Victoria (Australia)
Flora of South Australia
Plants described in 1793
Taxa named by James Edward Smith